Johanna Hagn (born 27 January 1973 in Wolfratshausen, Upper Bavaria) is a German judoka.

She won a bronze medal in the heavyweight (72 kg) division at the 1996 Summer Olympics.

External links
 

1973 births
Living people
People from Wolfratshausen
Sportspeople from Upper Bavaria
German female judoka
Judoka at the 1996 Summer Olympics
Olympic judoka of Germany
Olympic bronze medalists for Germany
Olympic medalists in judo
Medalists at the 1996 Summer Olympics
20th-century German women